HD 148156 is an 8th magnitude G-type main sequence star located approximately 168 light years away in the constellation Norma. This star is larger, hotter, brighter, and more massive than the Sun, and its metal content is almost twice as much.

The survey in 2015 have ruled out the existence of any additional stellar companions at projected distances from 49 to 345 astronomical units.

Planetary system
In 2009, a gas giant planet was found in orbit around the star.

See also 
 List of extrasolar planets

References 

G-type main-sequence stars
148156
080680
Norma (constellation)
Planetary systems with one confirmed planet
Durchmusterung objects